Lasindu Arosha (born 21 April 1999) is a Sri Lankan cricketer. He made his Twenty20 debut on 6 January 2020, for Unichela Sports Club in the 2019–20 SLC Twenty20 Tournament.

References

External links
 

1999 births
Living people
Sri Lankan cricketers